An annular solar eclipse will occur on Sunday, February 28, 2044. A solar eclipse occurs when the Moon passes between Earth and the Sun, thereby totally or partly obscuring the image of the Sun for a viewer on Earth. An annular solar eclipse occurs when the Moon's apparent diameter is smaller than the Sun's, blocking most of the Sun's light and causing the Sun to look like an annulus (ring). An annular eclipse appears as a partial eclipse over a region of the Earth thousands of kilometres wide.

This is the last of 55 umbral eclipses of Solar Saros 121. The 1st was in 1070 and the 55th will be in 2044. The total duration is 974 years.

Images 
Animated path

Related eclipses

Solar eclipses of 2044–2047

References

External links 
 http://eclipse.gsfc.nasa.gov/SEplot/SEplot2001/SE2044Feb28A.GIF

2044 2 28
2044 in science
2044 2 28
2044 2 28